The 2008 NORCECA Beach Volleyball Circuit at Manzanillo was held April 30 - May 5, 2008 in Manzanillo, Colima, Mexico. It was the fourth leg of the NORCECA Beach Volleyball Circuit 2008.

Women's competition

Men's competition

References
 Norceca

Manzanillo
Norceca Beach Volleyball Circuit (Manzanillo), 2008